Adam James Armstrong (born 10 February 1997) is an English professional footballer who plays as a striker for Premier League club Southampton.

Club career

Newcastle United
A lifelong Newcastle fan, Armstrong joined the club at the age of nine and progressed through the ranks, scoring five times in his first five Professional Development League matches.

Armstrong was named among Newcastle's substitutes for the first time on 28 January 2014 for a Premier League game against Norwich City, remaining unused in the goalless draw at Carrow Road. On 15 March, Armstrong made his debut as an 86th-minute substitute for Luuk de Jong in a league defeat to Fulham, making him the second youngest player to play for Newcastle in the Premier League after Kazenga LuaLua.

On 24 September 2014, Armstrong started his first game for Newcastle in a League Cup third round match against Crystal Palace. Newcastle won the match 3–2 in extra time with Armstrong providing assists for two of Newcastle's goals. Armstrong received his first Premier League start on 26 December in a 3–1 loss to Manchester United at Old Trafford.

Coventry City (loan)
On 28 July 2015, Armstrong joined Coventry City on a youth loan until 16 January 2016. He made his debut on 8 August, scoring both goals in a 2–0 win over Wigan Athletic at the Ricoh Arena in the first game of the new League One season. A week later, he netted another brace in a 4–0 victory away to Millwall, the first goal coming from 35 yards out. Former Coventry and Newcastle legend Micky Quinn challenged him to beat his record of ten goals in his first six games in 1992 following his own move from the North East to the West Midlands. After scoring again in his next match on 18 August in a 3–2 win against Crewe Alexandra, Armstrong won the League One Player of the Month award for August with five goals in his first five games.

On 19 September, Armstrong scored a sixth goal to give Coventry victory against Chesterfield, and on 3 October he netted a third brace of the campaign in a 3–0 win over Shrewsbury Town. He recorded consecutive braces on 31 October and 3 November, in home victories over Peterborough United and Barnsley, the former seeing his team come from 1–2 behind with ten minutes to go. Armstrong scored a first senior hat-trick on 2 January 2016, in a 5–0 win at Crewe Alexandra.

On 14 January 2016, Armstrong's loan was extended until the end of the season. He finished the season scoring 20 goals in his 40 Coventry appearances. In April, he was listed in the PFA Team of the Year for League One.

Barnsley (loan)
Despite making two appearances for Newcastle at the start of the 2016–17 season, on 30 August, Armstrong joined fellow Championship side Barnsley on an initial six-month loan deal, having signed a new four-year deal at St James' Park before his departure, after Newcastle manager Rafael Benítez expressed his desire for Armstrong to gain more experience at Championship level. He made his debut for the Tykes on 10 September as a substitute in place of Ryan Kent during a 2–1 victory at Preston North End, scoring the winning goal with a left-footed curling effort after outpacing and losing his marker with a backheel. In January 2017, it was announced that Armstrong had extended his loan spell at the club until the end of the 2016–17 season.

Bolton Wanderers (loan)
On 17 July 2017, Armstrong joined Championship side Bolton Wanderers until the following January. He made his debut for the club on 6 August, coming on as a late substitute for Stephen Darby in Bolton's 3–2 home defeat to Leeds United before making his first start in the EFL Cup at Crewe Alexandra, scoring in a 2–1 win. Armstrong was recalled from his loan spell on 4 January 2018, having made 23 appearances in all competitions.

Blackburn Rovers 
On 9 January 2018, Armstrong joined EFL League One side Blackburn Rovers on loan until the end of the season.
 He helped Blackburn secure promotion to the EFL Championship at the first time of asking.

Armstrong signed for Blackburn Rovers permanently on 6 August 2018 on a four-year contract for an undisclosed fee believed to be in the region of £1.75 million. Throughout the 2020–21 season, he scored three hat-tricks, coming against Wycombe Wanderers, Huddersfield Town and Birmingham City.

Armstrong scored 64 League and Cup goal in his 160 appearances for Rovers, including 29 goals in his final season with them.

Southampton
On 10 August 2021, Armstrong joined Premier League side Southampton on a four-year-deal for an undisclosed fee, reported to be in the region of £15 million. He scored on his debut for the club, a 3–1 defeat away to Everton on the opening day of the Premier League season. On 5 November 2021, Armstrong scored his second goal of the season in a 1–0 victory against Aston Villa. Armstrong would not score again during the 2021–22 season.

On 6 August 2022, he made his first appearance of the 2022–23 season in a 4–1 defeat to Tottenham Hotspur. On 30 August 2022, Armstrong scored his first league goal of the season in a 2–1 win against Chelsea. Armstrong ended his goal drought and scored on 7 January 2023 in a 2–1 victory against Crystal Palace in the FA Cup.

International career
Armstrong has represented England at under-16 and under-17 levels. He made his debut for the under-16 side on 27 September 2012, in a 5–0 win against Northern Ireland in the Victory Shield, as England retained the tournament title for the twelfth year in a row following wins against Wales, and Scotland. He scored his first goal on 13 February 2013, in a friendly against Germany after replacing Izzy Brown in the second half. He was named in the England squad to take part in the 2013 Montaigu Tournament in France, with England drawn against Germany, Netherlands and Chile. England began the tournament with a 1–1 draw against the Netherlands, and beat Chile 3–1 in the second game with goals from Patrick Roberts and Giorgio Rasulo. A 1–1 draw with Germany in the final game meant that England finished as group winners and faced Turkey in the final. Armstrong scored in the final which England lost on penalties after the game had finished 2–2.

This was to be his last appearance for the under-16 team, as he moved up to the under-17 side, scoring on his debut in a 1–0 win against Turkey in the FA International Tournament held at St George's Park National Football Centre in Burton upon Trent. He was named in the squad for the 2014 UEFA European Under-17 Championship qualifying round matches against Armenia, Gibraltar and Republic of Ireland, scoring twice in each of the three games, as England won the group scoring 18 goals without conceding a single goal. England were subsequently drawn against group hosts Czech Republic, Albania and Italy in the elite round. Armstrong played in the first two games, both 1–0 wins against the Czech Republic and Albania. The results left England needing only a draw against Italy in the final game to qualify for the tournament, and Armstrong opened the scoring as England won 2–1 and sealed qualification to the final tournament, held in Malta. Armstrong was called up to England's victorious 2014 UEFA European Under-17 Championship squad and scored twice during the competition before missing the final through injury.

On 26 August 2014, Armstrong received his first call-up to the under-18 team. He marked his debut with two goals in a friendly match against the Netherlands on 3 September. He followed this up with goals in victories against Poland and Switzerland to take his tally to four goals in his first four caps. In the second game against the Swiss, Armstrong scored twice as England won 6–1.

On 8 October 2015, Armstrong netted for England's under-19 team away to Macedonia. On 9 November 2016, now playing at U20 level, Armstrong scored a hat trick against Nigeria in South Korea.

2017 FIFA U-20 World Cup
Armstrong was selected for the England under-20 team in the 2017 FIFA U-20 World Cup. He made four appearances in the tournament, scoring a goal in the opening game against Argentina. He was an unused substitute in the final between England and Venezuela that England won 1–0, England's first win in a global tournament since their World Cup victory of 1966.

Career statistics

Honours

Blackburn Rovers
EFL League One runner-up: 2017–18

England U17
UEFA European Under-17 Championship: 2014

England U20
FIFA U-20 World Cup: 2017

England U21
Toulon Tournament: 2018

Individual
PFA Team of the Year: 2015–16 League One
PFA Team of the Year: 2020-21 Championship
Football League One Player of the Month: August 2015
Football League One Player of the Month: February 2018
EFL Championship Player of the Month: January 2019
Coventry City Goal of the Season 2015–16
Barnsley Goal of the Season 2016–17
Blackburn Rovers Goal of the Season 2019–20
Blackburn Rovers Player of the Season 2019–20
PFA Fans Championship Player of the Season 2020-21

References

External links

Profile at The Football Association

English footballers
Living people
Footballers from Newcastle upon Tyne
1997 births
Association football forwards
Newcastle United F.C. players
Coventry City F.C. players
Barnsley F.C. players
Bolton Wanderers F.C. players
Southampton F.C. players
England youth international footballers
England under-21 international footballers
Premier League players
English Football League players